Tegula is a genus of small to medium-sized sea snails, marine gastropod molluscs in the family Tegulidae.

Biology
The function of the heart in Tegula snails may have a critical importance for their temperature tolerance.

Species
Species within the genus Tegula include:

 Tegula argyrostoma (Gmelin, 1791)
 Tegula atra (Lesson, 1830)
 Tegula aureotincta (Forbes, 1850) - gilded tegula
 Tegula bergeroni McLean, 1970
 Tegula brunnea Philippi, 1848 - brown tegula: 
 Tegula cooksoni (E.A. Smith, 1877)
 Tegula corrugata (A. Adams, 1853)
 Tegula corteziana Mclean, 1970
 Tegula corvus (Philippi, 1850)
 Tegula eiseni Jordan, 1936 - banded tegula, western banded tegula
 Tegula euryomphala (Jonas, 1844) 
 Tegula excavata (Lamarck, 1822) - green-base tegula
 Tegula felipensis McLean, 1970
 Tegula funebralis (A. Adams, 1855) - black tegula: 
 Tegula gallina (Forbes, 1850) - speckled tegula
 Tegula globulus (Carpenter, 1857)
 Tegula gruneri (Philippi, 1849) - gem tegula
 Tegula hotessieriana (d'Orbigny, 1842) - Caribbean tegula
 Tegula ignota Ramírez-Böhme, 1976
 Tegula kusairo Yamazaki, Hirano, Chiba & Fukuda, 2020
 Tegula ligulata (Menke, 1850)
 Tegula luctuosa (d'Orbigny, 1841)
 Tegula mariana Dall, 1919
 Tegula melaleucos (Jonas, 1844)
 Tegula montereyi (Kiener, 1850)  Monterey tegula: 
 Tegula nigerrima (Gmelin, 1791)
 Tegula panamensis (Philippi, 1849)
 Tegula patagonica (d'Orbigny, 1840)
 Tegula pellisserpentis Wood, 1828
 Tegula pfeifferi (Philiippi, 1846)
 Tegula picta McLean, 1970
 Tegula pulligo (Gmelin, 1791) - dusky tegula
 Tegula puntagordana Weisbord, 1962
 Tegula quadricostata (W. Wood, 1828)
 Tegula regina Stearns, 1892 - queen tegula
 Tegula rubroflammulata (Koch in Philippi, 1843)
 Tegula rugata (A. Gould, 1861)
 Tegula rugosa (A. Adams, 1853)
 Tegula snodgrassi (Pilsbry & Vanatta, 1902)
 Tegula tridentata (Potiez & Michaud, 1838)
 Tegula turbinata (A. Adams, 1853)
 Tegula verdispira J. H. McLean, 1970
 Tegula verrucosa McLean, 1970
 Tegula xanthostigma (A. Adams, 1853)

Species brought into synonymy
 Tegula argyrostoma (Gmelin, 1791): synonym of Chlorostoma lischkei (Tapparone-Canefri, 1874)
 Tegula elegans Lesson, 1832: synonym of Tegula pellisserpentis (Wood, 1828)
 Tegula fasciata (Born, 1778) - silky tegula: synonym of Agathistoma fasciatum (Born, 1778) (recombination)
 Tegula fuscescens Philippi, R.A., 1845: synonym of Tegula patagonica (Orbigny, A.V.M.D. d', 1835)
 Tegula ligulata (Menke, 1850): synonym of Tegula ligulata mariamadrae Pilsbry & Lowe, 1932
 Tegula lischkei (Tapparone-Canefri, 1874): synonym of Chlorostoma lischkei (Tapparone-Canefri, 1874)
 Tegula lividomaculata (C. B. Adams, 1845) - West Indian tegula: synonym of Agathistoma lividomaculatum (C. B. Adams, 1845) (recombination)
 Tegula maculostriata (C. B. Adams): synonym of Tegula hotessieriana (d’Orbigny, 1842)
 Tegula mendella McLean, J.H., 1964: synonym of Tegula eiseni Jordan, 1936 
 Tegula phalera Weisbord, 1962: synonym of Tegula puntagordana Weisbord, 1962 
 Tegula rustica (Gmelin, 1791): synonym of Omphalius rusticus (Gmelin, 1791)
 Tegula scalaris (C.B. Adams, 1845): synonym of Tegula lividomaculata (C. B. Adams, 1845) 
 Tegula trilirata Weisbord, 1962: synonym of Tegula puntagordana Weisbord, 1962
 Tegula umbilicata Lischke, C.E. in Iwakawa, 1919: synonym of Chlorostoma argyrostoma turbinata (Adams, A., 1853); synonym of Tegula argyrostoma turbinatum A. Adams, 1853
 Tegula viridula (Gmelin, 1791): synonym of Agathistoma viridulum (Gmelin, 1791)

References

 Williams S.T., Karube S. & Ozawa T. (2008) Molecular systematics of Vetigastropoda: Trochidae, Turbinidae and Trochoidea redefined. Zoologica Scripta 37: 483–506

External links
  Classification of Southern California Turban Snails

 
Tegulidae
Gastropod genera
Taxa named by René Lesson